Elysium for the Brave is singer/songwriter Azam Ali's second album.

Track listing
"Endless Reverie" (Azam Ali; Carmen Rizzo;) - 5:46
"Spring Arrives" (Azam Ali) - 5:16
"In Other Worlds" (Azam Ali) - 6:06
"Abode" (Hedieh; Sadegh Nojouki) - 5:57
"Forty One Ways" (Azam Ali; Tyler Bates) - 6:08
"The Tryst" (Azam Ali; Trey Gunn) - 6:04
"From Heaven to Dust" (Azam Ali) - 4:20
"I Am a Stranger in This World" (Azam Ali; Jeff Rona; Loga Ramin Torkian) - 7:23
"In This Divide" (Azam Ali) - 5:18

References

2006 albums
Azam Ali albums
Six Degrees Records albums